José Ángel Coronel Benítez (born November 23, 1996) is a Mexican footballer who currently plays for Tritones Vallarta M.F.C.

He made his professional debut in a Copa MX match with Dorados de Sinaloa on 26 July 2017.

References

External links
 

1996 births
Living people
Association football forwards
Dorados de Sinaloa footballers
Loros UdeC footballers
Ascenso MX players
Liga Premier de México players
C.D. Tepatitlán de Morelos players
Tritones Vallarta M.F.C. footballers
Chihuahua F.C. footballers
Tercera División de México players
Footballers from Sinaloa
Sportspeople from Culiacán
Mexican footballers